Gunnar Berg Lampe (28 March 1892 – 29 May 1978) was a Norwegian tourist industry manager. He was born in Bergen. He led the Norway Travel Association over a period of forty years, from 1922 to 1962. He was decorated Knight, First Class of the Order of St. Olav in 1950.

References

1892 births
1978 deaths
Businesspeople from Bergen
20th-century Norwegian businesspeople